Brown Sugar is a 1931 British romance film directed by Leslie S. Hiscott and starring Constance Carpenter, Francis Lister, Allan Aynesworth and Helen Haye. It was largely filmed at Twickenham Studios in west London. It was produced by Julius Hagen as a quota quickie for distribution by the American company Warner Brothers. Local gentry disapprove when Lord Sloane chooses an actress for a wife.

Cast
 Constance Carpenter as Lady Stella Sloane  
 Francis Lister as Lord Sloane  
 Allan Aynesworth as Lord Knightsbridge  
 Helen Haye as Lady Knightsbridge  
 Cecily Byrne as Lady Honoria Nesbitt  
 Eva Moore as Mrs. Cunningham  
 Chili Bouchier as Ninon de Veaux  
 Gerald Rawlinson as Archie Wentworth  
 Alfred Drayton as Edmondson  
 Wallace Geoffrey as Crawbie Carruthers

References

Bibliography
Chibnall, Steve. Quota Quickies: The Birth of the British 'B' Film. British Film Institute, 2007.

External links 
 

1931 films
1930s English-language films
Films directed by Leslie S. Hiscott
1930s romance films
Films shot at Twickenham Film Studios
British films based on plays
British black-and-white films
British romance films
Quota quickies
1930s British films